John William Marsh (born 17 December 1947) is an English former professional footballer who played as a  goalkeeper.

Career
Born in Leeds, Marsh joined Bradford City in June 1966 from New Farnley. He made 12 league appearances for the club. He was released by the club in 1967.

Sources

References

1947 births
Living people
English footballers
Bradford City A.F.C. players
English Football League players
Association football goalkeepers